Shalil Rural District is in Miankuh District of Ardal County, Chaharmahal and Bakhtiari province, Iran. At the census of 2006, its population was 6,158 in 1,150 households; there were 5,618 inhabitants in 1,161 households at the following census of 2011; and in the most recent census of 2016, the population of the rural district was 4,593 in 1,142 households. The largest of its 29 villages was Shokrabad, with 823 people.

References 

Ardal County

Rural Districts of Chaharmahal and Bakhtiari Province

Populated places in Chaharmahal and Bakhtiari Province

Populated places in Ardal County